The Sorceress of Castle Grayskull, also known as Teela Na, is a fictional superhero from the Masters of the Universe franchise. Her first appearance was in "He-Man and the Power Sword"  (1981).

Appearances

Original MOTU mini-comics
The Sorceress first appears in the He-Man and the Power Sword mini-comic. This version has green skin and wears cobra-themed armor that, in later media is occasionally shown as belonging to Teela. In this story, the Sorceress gives He-Man his powers, which is consistent with later depictions. This mini-comic is the only time the Sorceress appears with green skin. This version of the Sorceress was later used as the basis for the character The Goddess in the Masters of the Universe Classics toyline.

In the second series of mini-comics, the Sorceress character, now called Goddess, is no longer green-skinned but still wears the cobra-themed armor. The mini-comic The Tale of Teela exposes warrior woman Teela as a Skeletor-created clone of the Sorceress/Goddess (also named Teela), thus clarifying why both characters were originally represented by one action figure. This mini-comic also establishes a biological link between both "Teela" characters, setting them up to be developed as mother and daughter in the He-Man and the Masters of the Universe TV series.

Eventually, the "Goddess" name is dropped, and the falcon-themed Sorceress (with the updated name "Teela Na", in order to distinguish her from warrior woman Teela) of the TV show would appear in the later mini-comics.

He-Man and The Masters of the Universe (1983)
In the Filmation series, He-Man and the Masters of the Universe, the Sorceress is the mistress and guardian of the Secrets of Castle Grayskull, the source of He-Man's great power.

With a vast knowledge of magic and history, she is among the wisest beings on Eternia. He-Man often seeks her counsel, especially when situations are at their worst. In the Filmation series, the Sorceress demonstrates saintly qualities such as humility and appears to other characters who are in need of guidance.

However, She-Ra's strength and abilities are limited outside of Castle Grayskull, making her vulnerable to attacks from enemies who know this weakness.  When she does need to travel, though, she generally assumes the form of a falcon known as Zoar. This weakness was removed from the character with the re-emergence of the Three Towers of Eternia, allowing her to travel freely in her human form.

The Sorceress is also the mother of Teela, a childhood friend of Prince Adam and Captain of the Royal Guard, whose aggressive temperament is a far cry from that of her soft-spoken mother. When Teela was an infant, the Sorceress gave her to Duncan (Man-At-Arms), to raise as his own, because the Sorceress felt that Castle Grayskull was too dangerous a place for her daughter to be raised. In the episode "Teela's Quest", Teela sets out to discover the truth of her mother from The Oracle of the Crystal Sea. She succeeds, but the Sorceress erases the revelation from Teela's memory for her own good, even though she desperately wishes she could tell her the truth. Other than Man-At-Arms, the only others who share the secret are He-Man, Battle Cat, and the Oracle of the Crystal Sea. It is also established in this episode that the Sorceress' daughter is destined to someday take her place as the magical guardian of Castle Grayskull.

The real name of the current Sorceress is Teela-Na. Her history is revealed in the 1984 episode "The Origin of the Sorceress", in which her past nemesis Morgoth returns and attacks Eternia. While waiting for Morgoth to reappear, the Sorceress explains to He-Man how she became the guardian of Castle Grayskull. Her home, the village of Nowella, was attacked, and subsequently conquered, by Morgoth and his allies Ferros, Repta, and Rachney, servants of the Evil Horde, although they were not mentioned by that name until later on. With the aid of an old storyteller's rhyme (In barren places find ye hope/And where no water flows, no plant grows, no wind blows/Find all you need...), Teela Na sought out Castle Grayskull, which she hoped would help her find a way to defeat her captors. Just as she was about to succumb to the Eternian wastelands, the mystical fortress appeared before Teela Na's eyes, and she was invited inside by a mysterious voice. Once inside she came across an old woman named Kuduk Ungol, her predecessor as the Sorceress. Kuduk invited her to take up the mantle of Castle Grayskull's protector, which she accepts and is imbued with the powers of Castle Grayskull. Once she had taken her place as the guardian of Castle Grayskull, the Sorceress returned to Nowella and overthrew the invaders before returning to her new home inside Castle Grayskull. Kuduk Ungol was gone by this time, her fate unrevealed.

She-Ra: Princess of Power (1985)
In the She-Ra: Princess of Power series (a spin-off of the He-Man series about He-Man's twin sister She-Ra, who like He-Man gets her powers from Castle Grayskull), the Sorceress summons Prince Adam to find Princess Adora and give her the Sword of Protection, which looks just like He-Man's sword, but has a jewel in it.  Adora becomes She-Ra for the first time after the Sorceress contacts her via telepathy and tells her her destiny and reveals that she is He-Man's twin sister.

Masters of the Universe (1987 film)

The live-action film, Masters of the Universe, showcased Christina Pickles in the role of Sorceress. In the film, the Sorceress has been imprisoned by Skeletor, and her powers are being siphoned into him; the result leaves her aged and dying. Once Skeletor is eventually defeated, her powers and true appearance are seemingly restored.

The Sorceress is clothed in long white robes, with feather-like strands of white fabric hanging from her arms as a homage to the original design, although they are only visible in the scene where she waves goodbye to the characters of Julie and Kevin. Rather than a bird-like headpiece, crystals are placed throughout the Sorceress' long, silver hair like a crown.

The New Adventures of He-Man (1989–1992)
In The New Adventure, the first minicomic for the new series, the Sorceress appears in her classic falcon form, and warns Prince Adam that the Galactic Guardians, tricked by Skeletor, are siphoning the Power of Grayskull. She later appears with a totally different chrome armor, evoking the futuristic feeling of the new series, saying that He-Man will not become Prince Adam again, and that He-Man now had to say the name of the Starship Eternia in order to transform.

In The New Adventures of He-Man animated series, the Sorceress wears an amalgamation of her classic falcon suit and chrome armor. She often appears in He-Man's mind, giving him advice. She can also reach out into the future with her powers to assist He-Man and his allies, and has been shown to talk to Master Sebrian telepathically. In one episode, she even sends Teela into the future to offer the homesick prince of Eternia comfort.

Masters of the Universe vs. The Snake Men (2002)
In the 2002 series, the attire of the Sorceress was redesigned to evoke the feeling of an Egyptian goddess rather than a falcon. She is still Teela's mother, and that fact is still kept secret. The episode "Out of the Past" briefly reveals part of the Sorceress' history, and how Teela was conceived after the Sorceress married an unnamed soldier, who supposedly died in battle. Her husband is seen in heavy bandaging throughout his appearance, and his identity remains unconfirmed throughout the series. However, it is suspected to be Man-At-Arms himself, as the heavily bandaged soldier has his eyes and build. A conversation between Duncan and the Sorceress also implies that Man-At-Arms is indeed Teela's true father.

When not dressed in formal attire, the Sorceress looks strikingly like her daughter Teela, only taller. They both have red hair. If the series had continued, it was intended that in the third season, Teela would discover that the Sorceress is her mother, but would not have lost the memory as she does in the original series.

The Sorceress is also shown as a capable fighter on two occasions: In the episode "Out of the Past", she saves a village from a band of marauders led by Prahvus, while in another, "Rise of the Snakemen Part II", she fights against King Hiss by unleashing a powerful magical blast against the evil Snake-Men's leader before attacking him with her staff; unfortunately, the Sorceress is bitten by the ancient villain, and she spends the remainder of the series recovering from his poison. Her body still shows the physical scars of when the poison was in her system.

The comic book produced by MVC, which follows the 2002 canon, also depicted the Sorceress' fighting prowess when she defeats Evil-Lyn in direct conflict during a storyline that saw the first appearance of Hordak.

Just as there were previous Sorceresses in the 1980s He-Man series, the current Sorceress is not the first. The wife of King Grayskull, known as Veena, was seemingly the original Sorceress of Castle Grayskull. She has a similar appearance to Teela Na, can also transform into a bird, and it was she who was first entrusted with the Power Sword's protection following the death of King Grayskull.

Had the series continued into the third season, She-Ra would have been introduced, with the Sorceress again sending He-Man on the quest to locate his sister with the Sword of Protection.

Masters of the Universe Classics (2008–2015)
In the storyline of the latest Mattel toyline, Teela is the clone of the Sorceress Teela Na. She eventually takes over from her as the new Sorceress, and will one day become the wife of King He-Man and mother to their son Dare.

He-Man and the Masters of the Universe (2012)

In this comic, the term sorceress is more equal to the priestess. There were at least 3 sorceresses serving three different gods  Teela Na served as an oracle of the goddess Zoar. Teela Na was the wife of Man in Arms and the mother of Teela although Teela wasn't aware of it until Teela Na's death. At some point, Skeletor took over Castle Grayskull and captured her. To save Prince Adam who lost his memory she creates an illusion of a falcon to which Adam calls Zoar. However, Skeletor killed her before Adam was able to return to the castle. She appeared again during the “ What Lies Within “ arc. During the final fight with Snake people in the circle of eternity, Teela has fallen into eternity where she met with Teela Na once more. She claimed her daughter as a new sorceress and transformed her into a snake woman. She became an oracle of the snake people god Sepos.
She then reappeared as a ghost helping her daughter in the final fight with Evil-Lyn.Evil-Lyn herself became a sorceress at the end serving  as priestess of Horkoth the god of the hordes.

Powers and abilities
The Sorceress is able to project her telepathic image to others, especially He-Man. Her telepathy is very powerful, as she can contact He-Man across great distances as well as sense the thoughts, emotions, and motives of others.

The Sorceress can also teleport herself and others across vast distances, and in the episode "The Cosmic Comet", she temporarily grants He-Man the ability to fly. She can disguise herself as other people, as seen in the episode "Lessons", where she takes on the appearance of an old man. She also has telekinetic abilities, the ability to project images, create fire, and can produce magical shields and the ability to launch powerful blasts of magical energy.

Portrayal
In the 1980s series, the Sorceress is voiced by Linda Gary, who also voiced Teela, Evil-Lyn, and Queen Marlena among others. In the 1987 film, Masters of the Universe, she is played by Christina Pickles. In the New Adventures she was voiced by Venus Terzo, and in the 2002 series by Nicole Oliver, who also voiced Queen Marlena.

Reception
Comic Book Resources listed the character at ninth place in He-Man: 15 Most Powerful Masters of the Universe.

References

External links
The Sorceress at Comic Vine
Sorceress of Grayskull at Writeups.org

Comics characters introduced in 1982
Female characters in animated series
Female superheroes
Fictional characters who can teleport
Fictional characters who use magic
Fictional characters with fire or heat abilities
Fictional characters with slowed ageing
Fictional shapeshifters
Fictional telekinetics
Fictional telepaths
Fictional witches
Masters of the Universe Heroic Warriors
Superheroes